Athetis striolata is a moth of the family Noctuidae. It was described by Arthur Gardiner Butler in 1886. It is found on Fiji and in Australia (the Northern Territory, Queensland and New South Wales).

References

 "Athetis striolata (Butler, 1886)". Insecta.pro. Retrieved 4 February 2020.

Moths described in 1886
Acronictinae
Moths of Fiji
Moths of Australia